Hoobastank (sometimes stylized as h∞bastank, and originally known as Hoobustank) is an American rock band formed in 1994 in Agoura Hills, California, by lead vocalist Doug Robb, guitarist Dan Estrin, drummer Chris Hesse, and original bassist Markku Lappalainen. They were signed to Island Records from 2001 to 2012 and have released six albums and one extended play to date. Their most recent album, Push Pull, was released on May 25, 2018. They have sold 10 million albums worldwide. The band is best known for their biggest hit single, "The Reason".

History

Early career (1994–2000)
Vocalist Doug Robb had known guitarist Dan Estrin for some time before competing against him in a high school battle of the bands competition and subsequently, they decided to form a band.  They then recruited Markku Lappalainen and Chris Hesse to form Hoobastank.

The band has provided a variety of explanations for the origin of the band's unusual name, and it is unclear where it originated from. Claims have included that it is a mispronunciation of a German street, slang for someone who owns many sneakers, or a word the band came up with while they were "joking around."

Hoobastank started playing gigs at the local venue Cobalt Cafe along with Incubus and Linkin Park. They recorded their first full-length self-released album in 1998 called They Sure Don't Make Basketball Shorts Like They Used To, which features a saxophone section headed by Jeremy Wasser, who executive produced the album and recorded the "Summer Romance" saxophone solo on Incubus' S.C.I.E.N.C.E. album. The Incubus connections continued with Fourth Street Recording's music producer Jim Wirt and logos and visual design by Brett Spivey.

By this stage, Hoobastank had developed a strong reputation in Southern California. This attracted interest from Island Records, who subsequently signed the band in 2000. At the time of signing, the band had completed a second full-length album, titled Forward, also featuring Jeremy Wasser. However, the band felt that the direction they were heading in would work best without a sax, so Wasser departed the band and the album was shelved. A few tracks were rerecorded for release on the band's self-titled 2001 release. The original recordings from the Forward sessions made their way to the Internet via peer to peer sites in late 2001.

Hoobastank (2001–2002)
Hoobastank released its self-titled debut album in November 2001. The first single was "Crawling in the Dark", which was a breakthrough hit, reaching No. 68 on the Billboard Hot 100, No. 3 on the Modern Rock chart, No. 7 on the Mainstream Rock chart and No. 1 on an MP3.com download chart in early 2002. Also, the song was featured in the 2002 inline skating game, Aggressive Inline, appearing on the Xbox, PlayStation, PlayStation 2 and GameCube consoles. The second single "Running Away" was even more successful, reaching No. 44 on the Billboard Hot 100, No. 2 on the Modern Rock chart, No. 9 on the Mainstream Rock chart and No. 3 on the MP3.com download chart. The Hoobastank album went Platinum due to these hit singles and reached No. 25 on the Billboard 200 album charts and No. 1 on the Billboard Heatseeker chart.

The album achieved recognition internationally with the band touring in Europe and Asia in support of the record. "Remember Me", the third single released from this album, was a moderate hit, reaching No. 23 on the Modern Rock charts. The band made a song titled "Losing My Grip" for the soundtrack of the movie The Scorpion King.

The Reason (2003–2005)
In early 2003, the group contributed the song "Right Before Your Eyes" to Daredevil: The Album. The band then entered the studio with producer Howard Benson. Recording was disrupted for a month when Dan Estrin was seriously injured in a minibike accident in August. Estrin had recovered by October and the band headed off on a Nokia Unwired Tour with The All-American Rejects and Ozomatli in November.

Their second album The Reason was released in December 2003. The single "Out of Control" was made available for download on the band's website. Doug Robb said on the band's website: "A lot of it is about asking questions or questioning all that people see. It's not all about religion. "Out of Control" is about that and about opening your eyes after being blinded by being devoted to anything." "Same Direction" would reach No. 9 on the US Modern Rock chart, No. 16 on the Mainstream Rock chart and No. 16 on a composite World Modern Rock chart (based on the US, Germany, Sweden, Finland, Canada, and Australia). A year later, the Let It Out DVD collected the band's videos. "The Reason" was put to a popular music video on Tangle.

The title track was released as a single in the first half of 2004. It became a hit, reaching No. 2 on the Billboard Hot 100, No. 1 on the US and World Modern Rock charts, No. 10 in Australia, No. 12 in the United Kingdom and No. 15 in Germany. In Canada, it spent 21 weeks at the top, setting a new record for most weeks at No. 1.  Meanwhile, in the United States, the album reached No. 3 on the Billboard 200 album chart.

The band's international profile was increased by a support slot on Linkin Park's Meteora world tour in early 2004.

Every Man for Himself (2006–2007)

Their third album Every Man for Himself was released in May 2006 and debuted at No. 12 on the Billboard chart. Three singles, "If I Were You", "Inside of You", and "Born to Lead", were released. Another single, "If Only", was planned to be released but was canceled for unknown reasons, possibly because of the low chart achievements of the first three singles. Despite this, the album has been certified Gold in the United States.

On a 2005 co-headlining tour with Velvet Revolver, the band received a chilly reception from some audiences and rumors of a feud between Robb and Velvet Revolver frontman Scott Weiland were soon filling Internet message boards. "If I Were You" from Every Man for Himself addressed the whole affair. Robb later said in an interview with MTV News online that he has nothing against Scott Weiland or any other member of Velvet Revolver.

For(N)ever and The Greatest Hits (2008–2009)
In October 2007, Robb posted on the official Hoobastank message boards and said that they have "set the bar very very high for this next CD" and that they have "more ideas going into this CD than ever before". On June 2, 2008, Robb posted an update on their temporary website, announcing that the recording process of their upcoming album was almost done and to expect a release date within a couple of weeks. On September 19, Robb posted a Myspace bulletin announcing that the "new Hoobastank album is nearly done".

The first single from the album, "My Turn", premiered on radio October 13, 2008. The album For(N)ever was released on January 27, 2009, as announced by Doug Robb in a blog entry on the band's official website. The song was featured as the theme song for TNA Wrestling's Destination X 2009 Pay Per View.

On April 20, 2010, a Vanessa Amorosi fan website revealed details of a collaboration between Hoobastank and the Australian singer, a duet version of "The Letter". On August 5, it was confirmed that there was another version of the song on Universal International. This one was a duet between Hoobastank and the American-Japanese singer, lyricist, actress and model Anna Tsuchiya. The website, VanessaAmorosi.net, also provided the duet version to be streamed in full for the first time. The music video was shot in Los Angeles at Lacy Street Studio with director Paul Brown. The video and single was serviced to Australian media on May 4. While the single was released in Australia on June 19, 2009, featuring Vanessa Amorosi, the version of the song featuring Anna Tsuchiya appears on the deluxe edition of Hoobastank's greatest hits album The Greatest Hits: Don't Touch My Moustache.

For(N)ever had its Australian release on June 26.

The best of album The Greatest Hits: Don't Touch My Moustache was released on August 5, through Universal Records in Japan. The Deluxe Edition's tracks were selected from their first four albums by Hoobastank fans on the band's official record label website.

Hoobastank was a support band on Creed's 2009 reunion tour.

Is This the Day? (2009–2010)
Hoobastank announced on Twitter that they were recording an acoustic album on September 2, 2009.

On October 30, Hoobastank covered the song "Ghostbusters" for Halloween and a music video was released on Hoobastank's official YouTube channel.

The band released the live album Live from the Wiltern in December 8, which was available exclusively through iTunes.

Hoobastank released a new song entitled "We Are One" on January 19, 2010, as part of a compilation from Music for Relief in support of the Haiti earthquake crisis.

On February 12, Hoobastank released a new song entitled "Never Be Here Again" as part of the AT&T Team USA Soundtrack.

In May, the band announced that they would be performing an acoustic live tour at several places in Japan. They released an acoustic album titled Is This the Day? on August 4, 2010, in Japan, but it has yet to be released in the United States.

Fight or Flight (2011–2015)
On April 5, 2012, the band announced on Twitter that their new album's name was to be titled Fight or Flight. On May 3, the band revealed the first single "This Is Gonna Hurt". The album was released on September 11, 2012.

To promote the album, two more singles, "Can You Save Me?" and "Incomplete", accompanied by a touring music video and a lyric video respectively, were released.

On August 2, 2013, former member Jeremy Wasser made a one-off appearance on Sunset Strip Music Festival at Whisky a Go Go in West Hollywood, California. He played sax with the band in songs "Earthsick" and "Can I Buy You A Drink?" from They Sure Don't Make Basketball Shorts Like They Used To.

Push Pull (2016–present)
In November 2016, the band began recording for their sixth studio album. They began working with producer Matt Wallace as posted by members Doug Robb and Dan Estrin on Facebook and Instagram. On January 28, 2017, Doug Robb stated on Twitter that "Studio's done. New music coming".

Doug Robb provided the lyrics and vocals for "Fist Bump", the theme song of the 2017 video game Sonic Forces. On October 19, 2017, the band had signed with Napalm Records. They also announced that the sixth studio album is finished and expected to be released in the first half of 2018.

On March 29, 2018, Hoobastank announced their next album Push Pull. It was released worldwide on May 25, along with the album's first single, "More Beautiful".

Throughout 2018, the band went on their tour to commemorate the 15th anniversary of their 2003 album The Reason, playing the album in its entirety. On August 16, 2019, Hoobastank announced that they would be re-releasing the album on October 4 with a vinyl release and a digital version with bonus tracks.

In September 2022, A documentary series about the making of their self-titled debut studio album was released, in commemoration of the 20th anniversary of the album. It was uploaded on their official YouTube channel.

Musical style
Hoobastank has been categorized under genres such as post-grunge, alternative rock, hard rock, and nu metal, On their early independent releases, the band used a funk metal and ska punk sound and had a saxophonist in the band. On their major-label, self-titled, debut album, the band's sound changed; they removed their saxophonist and became a four-piece rock band, using an alternative rock sound. The band's sound matured in their second album, The Reason, and became more melodic.

Band members

Current members
 Doug Robb – lead vocals, rhythm guitar 
 Dan Estrin – lead guitar, backing vocals 
 Chris Hesse – drums, backing vocals 
 Jesse Charland – bass, keyboards, backing vocals

Studio members
Paul Bushnell – bass 
Chris Chaney – bass

Former members
Jeremy Wasser – saxophone 
Derek Kwan – saxophone 
Markku Lappalainen – bass 
Matt McKenzie – bass 
Josh Moreau – bass, backing vocals 
David Amezcua – bass, backing vocals

Timeline

Discography

Studio albums
 Hoobastank (2001)
 The Reason (2003)
 Every Man for Himself (2006)
 Fornever (2009)
 Fight or Flight (2012)
 Push Pull (2018)

References

External links

 
 
 An interview with the band from 2009's Rock on the Range

Alternative rock groups from California
American post-grunge musical groups
Island Records artists
Musical groups established in 1994
Musical groups from Los Angeles
Musical quartets
Nu metal musical groups from California
1994 establishments in California